The Satellite Award for Best Television Series – Drama is an annual award given by the International Press Academy as one of its Satellite Awards.

Winners and nominees

1990s

2000s

2010s

2020s

References

External links	
 Official website

Television Series Drama